The Buckeye Building, also known as the Buckeye State Building and Loan Company Building, is a historic building in Downtown Columbus, Ohio. The 16-story building was built from 1926 to 1927. It was the headquarters for the Buckeye State Building and Loan Company, and after 1949 for the Buckeye Federal Savings and Loan Association. It was listed on the National Register of Historic Places in 2004. The building was converted into a hotel, opening as a Marriott Residence Inn in 2008.

See also
 National Register of Historic Places listings in Columbus, Ohio

References

External links
 Marriott hotel website

Bank buildings on the National Register of Historic Places in Ohio
Neoclassical architecture in Ohio
Commercial buildings completed in 1927
Buildings in downtown Columbus, Ohio
National Register of Historic Places in Columbus, Ohio
1927 establishments in Ohio
Hotels in Columbus, Ohio
Marriott hotels